Jigarthandaa is a 2016 Indian Kannada-language action comedy film directed by Shiva Ganesh,  written by Karthik Subbaraj and produced by Kichcha Creations and SRV Productions. The film was a remake of 2014 Tamil film of same name which itself was inspired by the 2006 South Korean movie A Dirty Carnival.
It stars Rahul and Samyukta Hornad along with P. Ravi Shankar, Chikkanna, Dharma, K. Manju, Guruprasad, Sadhu Kokila and Veena Sundar in supporting roles. Arjun Janya composed film's score and soundtrack. It was released on 24 June 2016.

Cast
 Rahul Salanke as Rahul, an aspiring Film Director
 P. Ravi Shankar as Assault Armuga, a dreaded goon
 Samyukta Hornad as Lakshmi
 Chikkanna as Raahul's friend
 K. Manju as himself, a Film producer
 Sadhu Kokila as Acting Trainer
 H. G. Dattatreya
 Dharma as Police Inspector
 Veena Sundar
 Rakshit Shetty as himself,  cameo appearance

Soundtrack
Soundtrack was composed by Arjun Janya.

References

External links 

2016 films
2010s Kannada-language films
Indian action comedy films
Indian black comedy films
Indian satirical films
Kannada remakes of Tamil films
Films scored by Arjun Janya
Films directed by Shiva Ganesh